The 470 World Championships have been held every year since 1970 and organised by the International 470 Class Association and recognized by the International Sailing Federation. When the Championship forms part of the ISAF Sailing World Championships the ISAF also organise the event. The 470 is a sailboat class used as equipment for the Olympic Sailing Competition.

Editions

Medallists

Open

Men and Mixed

Men

Women

Mixed

Junior Male and Mixed

Junior Female

Multiple medallists

See also
World championships in sailing
World Sailing

References

2013 official results at Worlds.470.org

External links
Class Association Webpage
ISAF 470 Microsite
Sailing competitions

 
Recurring sporting events established in 1970